Sze Tak-loy (born 1982) is a Hong Kong politician. He is currently chairman of the Hong Kong Association for Democracy and People's Livelihood (ADPL) and was a member of the Wong Tai Sin District Council for Tung Mei.

In the 2015 District Council elections, Sze was first elected to the Wong Tai Sin District Council, succeeding veteran Mok Ying-fan in Tung Mei.

In 2016, Sze became vice-chairman alongside Tam Kwok-kiu while Rosanda Mok became the first party chairwoman. In the 2016 Legislative Council election when Mok resigned as ADPL chairwoman after the party lost all its seats in the Legislative Council, Sze acted as chairman. In December 2016, he was elected new party chairman.

On 6 January 2021, Sze was among 53 members of the pro-democratic camp who were arrested under the national security law, specifically its provision regarding alleged subversion. The group stood accused of the organisation of and participation in unofficial primary elections held by the camp in July 2020. Sze was released on bail on 7 January.

References

1982 births
Living people
District councillors of Wong Tai Sin District
Hong Kong Association for Democracy and People's Livelihood politicians
Hong Kong political prisoners